The Battle Mound Site (3LA1) is an archaeological site in Lafayette County, Arkansas in the Great Bend region of the Red River basin. The majority of the mound was built from 1200-1400 CE. The site has the largest mound of the Caddoan Mississippian culture (a regional variation of the Mississippian culture).

Four low rises at the site are believed also to have been constructed earthwork mounds. Many burial grounds, occupation areas, and other mound sites in the area may be connected with this site.  Minor investigations were conducted at the site by Dr. Alex D. Krieger of the University of Texas at Austin and his assistant Mr. Lynn E. Howard, between June 25 and September 11, 1948. The field notes and a full analysis of the excavation have not been published. In recent years archaeologist Duncan P. McKinnon has been conducting research at the site using archaeogeophysical means.

See also
 Spiro Mounds
 List of Mississippian sites

References

External links
 Duncan P. Mackinnon, "EXPLORING SETTLEMENT PATTERNING AT A PREMIER CADDO MOUND SITE IN THE RED RIVER GREAT BEND REGION", Southeastern Archaeology, Vol. 28, No. 2 (Winter 2009), pp. 248-258; via JSTOR
 Battle Mound Geophysics 1
 Battle Mound on Youtube

Caddoan Mississippian culture
Archaeological sites in Arkansas
Mounds in Arkansas
Buildings and structures in Lafayette County, Arkansas